George Leopold Rankine (4 November 1884 – 26 July 1945), known as "Leo", was an Australian rules footballer who played with Richmond in the Victorian Football League (VFL).

Family
The son of Henry George Rankine, and Eva Anne Rankine, née Crossley, George Leopold Rankine was born at Warrnambool on 4 November 1884.

He married Guelda Delicia Eunice Smith on 11 August 1923. Their son, Bryce Crossley Rankine (1925-2013), B.Sc., M.Sc., D.Sc., was made a Member of the Order of Australia in the 1986 Australia Day Honours for service to wine industry technology and to education.

Football
He played two First XVIII matches for Richmond: against University on 4 July 1908, and against Fitzroy on 11 July 1908.

After football
He was employed for many years as a Government Stock Inspector.

Death
He died on 6 July 1945.

Notes

External links 
 
 
 George Leopold Rankine, at Murray Bridge Cemetery.

1884 births
1945 deaths
Australian rules footballers from Victoria (Australia)
Richmond Football Club players